Laetitia Denis (born 4 February 1988 in Yaoundé, Cameroon) is a French athlete specializing in the 400 metres hurdles.

Biography

A versatile athlete, she made her debut in the heptathlon by finishing sixth of the 2005 Cadet World Championships with a total of 5402 points. She won in 2006 the junior national titles in the 400m hurdles and the 60m hurdles, and became vice-European champion in the 110m hurdles in 2007.  Junior champion of France at the 110m hurdles in 2008, she won the bronze medal in the relay 4 × 400 m at the 2009 Summer Universiade.

In March 2011, Laetitia Denis won the relay bronze medal for the 4 × 400 m at the European Indoor Championships in Paris-Bercy alongside Muriel Hurtis-Houairi, Floria Gueï and Marie Gayot.  The French team ran a time of 3 min 32 s 16 losing that day  to Russia and the UK
.

Achievements

Personal Bests

References

1988 births
Living people
French female hurdlers
Sportspeople from Yaoundé
Cameroonian emigrants to France
Universiade medalists in athletics (track and field)
Universiade bronze medalists for France
Competitors at the 2007 Summer Universiade
Medalists at the 2009 Summer Universiade